"Electric Chapel" is a song recorded by American singer Lady Gaga for her second studio album, Born This Way (2011). Written and produced by Gaga and DJ White Shadow, the recording premiered on Facebook gaming app FarmVille, as did the album's fifth single, "Marry the Night". Gaga revealed on Twitter that "Electric Chapel" was written in Australia and finished on her tour bus in Europe. She recorded it channeling the vocals of bands like Duran Duran, and singers Cher and Billy Idol.

"Electric Chapel" is an electronic rock and glam metal song that incorporates elements of 80s pop music and heavy metal in its composition. Critics praised the track, with Dan Martin from NME comparing it to the work of Madonna; other reviewers noted the rock and sci-fi musical elements associated in it. "Electric Chapel" reached number 23 on Billboards Dance/Electronic Digital Songs chart and number 144 on the South Korean International Download Chart. It was performed on Gaga's Born This Way Ball tour (2012–2013), where she sang it while standing inside a set piece that had the song's name written on top.

Background and composition
"Electric Chapel" was first previewed when a one-minute portion of its instrumental was used for Gaga's Transmission Gagavision 44 video. With the title's track being displayed on a paper during the end of the clip, it additionally made an appearance in the music video for "Judas" (2011). Subsequently, Gaga revealed on Twitter that the song was written in Australia and finished on her tour bus in Europe. Describing the recording's lyrical themes as delving on "needing to feel safe to find love", it was theorized by a writer from Take 40 Australia to be inspired by the singer's 2009 live performance on Australia's The Chapel arena. Like the opening track of Born This Way—"Marry the Night"—the song made its debut on a special edition of social network game FarmVille, called GagaVille and released on May 18, 2011.

"Electric Chapel" has been compared to the work of Madonna, with NMEs Dan Martin saying that "if you'd ever wondered what that Madonna doing the soundtrack to Blade Runner might have sounded like... then wonder no more." Genre-wise, Brian Hiatt of Rolling Stone referred "Electric Chapel" to as an electro rock recording, while Robbie Daw of Idolator dubbed the song as being of the pop metal genre, attesting that unlike fellow song from Born This Way, "Heavy Metal Lover", "Electric Chapel" possesses an actual metal-edge. Gaga recorded the chorus a number of times, channeling the vocals of bands like Duran Duran, and singers Cher and Billy Idol. Inspired by 1980s music, the track incorporates a spoken word section, which Gaga wanted to sound like The B-52's song "Rock Lobster" (1978). She explained to Brian Hiatt of Rolling Stone that when she "say[s] 'electric chapel,' something needs to occur... It needs to be more fantasy. You should see the empress of the Vatican unicorn planet appear and soar across the nightclub."

Writing for music website Beats Per Minute, Brent Koepp described the song as "Iron Maiden meets 80s pop". According to the sheet music published by Musicnotes.com, "Electric Chapel" has a time signature of common time, and a pop-rock tempo of 128 beats per minute. The song is composed in the key of A minor with Gaga's vocals ranging from E3 to C5. It also has a basic sequence of Am–Dm–Am–Dm–F serving as its chord progression. "Electric Chapel" was later remixed by Irish indie rock band Two Door Cinema Club; this version was included on the singer's second remix album titled Born This Way: The Remix (2011). Gaga unveiled the remix during a cover shoot for Elle magazine. A reviewer from BBC Music complimented the remix, saying that "Two Door Cinema Club almost make 'Electric Chapel' sound like a collaboration between Gaga and Hot Chip".

Reception

Overall, "Electric Chapel" received positive reviews from music critics. Robbie Daw from Idolator felt that "Electric Chapel" surpassed the released singles from Born This Way in craftsmanship and praised the "hard rock ominous guitar riffs", calling them a tease. Vocally, he found Gaga was channeling Lita Ford and dubbed the track as one of the album's strongest compositions. Caryn Ganz of Spin wrote that "Electric Chapel" "pairs divine diva thump with a Van Halen guitar solo." NME writer Dan Martin published a review on the song, confessing that "perhaps ['Electric Chapel'] nails the record's blood-and-chrome aesthetics most effectively of all." In another review, Martin compared its opening riffs to Opus III's 1983 song "It's a Fine Day", with him further likening the recording to science fiction music. Kerri Mason from Billboard described the track as a "technicolor wedding" with a "fat guitar riff". Bradley Stern from MuuMuse praised the cut, feeling that "Gaga takes Born This Way to new levels of pop-dom on cuts like the jagged 'Electric Chapel' and 'Heavy Metal Lover'".

Ann Powers from NPR noticed the influence of Duran Duran in the track, while believing Gaga to imagine "Electric Chapel" as an output from "an electric guitar-wielding girl group". Jody Rosen from Rolling Stone did reviewed Born This Way track-wise, observing that in "Electric Chapel" Gaga wrote about hoping for a monogamous relationship, with heavy guitar riffs and metal solo being characteristics of the record. In an article in GQ about 10 detrimental things on Born This Way, a writer from the magazine listed the track's lyrics as "reek[ing] of a lack of ideas, not a distortion of form. Sing words. It's easy".

"Electric Chapel" debuted and peaked at number 23 on Billboards Dance/Electronic Digital Songs chart on the issue dated June 11, 2011, spending one week on the chart. It also made an appearance at number 144 on the South Korean International Download Chart.

Live performances
Gaga performed "Electric Chapel" on her Born This Way Ball tour (2012–2013). The track was included during the tour's third segment, where Gaga performed "The Queen" and "You and I", before transcending into "Electric Chapel" and "Americano" from Born This Way. The singer was present inside a glass set piece onstage, referred by her as an electric chapel. Sean Sennett from The Australian complimented the performance of the song, saying that "by the time 'Electric Chapel' has rolled around the band are shredding like a glorious 80s LA metal act". Kwaak Je-yup from The Korea Times gave positive feedback to Gaga for singing live during the tour, but found her voice cracked during "Electric Chapel".

Credits and personnel

Recording and management
 Recorded at Officine Meccaniche in Milan, Italy
 Mixed at Setai Recording Studio (Miami Beach)
 Mastered at Oasis Mastering (Burbank, California)
 Published by Stefani Germanotta P/K/A Lady Gaga (BMI) Sony/ATV Songs, LLC/ House of Gaga Publishing, LLC / GloJoe Music Inc. (BMI)
 Maxwell and Carter Publishing, LLC (ASCAP), administered by Universal Music Publishing Group and Maxwell and Carter Publishing, LLC (BMI) administered by Universal Music Publishing Group.

Personnel
Lady Gaga – vocals, songwriter, producer
DJ White Shadow – drum programming, keyboards
Brian Gaynor – keyboards, bass
Kareem "Jesus" Devlin Byrne – guitars
Dave Russell – recording, mixing
Gene Grimaldi – audio mastering
Philip Knight – assistant

Charts

References

2011 songs
American heavy metal songs
Electronic rock songs
Glam metal songs
Lady Gaga songs
Song recordings produced by Lady Gaga
Songs written by DJ White Shadow
Songs written by Lady Gaga